Paki is a term typically directed towards people of Pakistani descent mainly in British slang, and as an offensive slur is often used indiscriminately towards people of perceived South Asian descent in general. The slur is used primarily in the United Kingdom, the Benelux and Canada, where the term is commonly associated with "Paki-bashing", which consists of violent attacks against people of perceived Pakistani and South Asian origin.

Etymology 
"Paki" is derived from the exonym Pakistan. The term Paki means "purity" in Persian, Urdu and Pashto. There was no "Pak" or "Paki" ethnic group before the state was created. The name of Pakistan (initially as "Pakstan") was coined by the Cambridge University law student and Muslim ultra-nationalist Rahmat Ali, and was published on 28 January 1933 in the pamphlet Now or Never.

History

United Kingdom 
The use of the term "Paki" was first recorded in 1964, during a period of increased South Asian immigration to the United Kingdom. At this time, the term "Paki" was very much in mixed usage; it was often used as a slur. In addition to Pakistanis (which included Bangladeshis up until 1971), it has also been directed at people of other South Asian backgrounds as well as people from other demographics who physically resemble South Asians. Starting in the late-1960s, and peaking in the 1970s and 1980s, violent gangs opposed to immigration took part in attacks known as "Paki-bashing", which targeted and assaulted South Asians and businesses owned by them, and occasionally other ethnic minorities. "Paki-bashing" became more common after Enoch Powell's Rivers of Blood speech in 1968; polls at the time showed that Powell's anti-immigrant rhetoric held support amongst the majority of the white populace at the time. "Paki-bashing" peaked during the 1970s1980s, with the attackers often being supporters of far-right fascist, racist and anti-immigrant movements, including the white power skinheads, the National Front, and the British National Party. These attacks were usually referred to as either "Paki-bashing" or "skinhead terror", with the attackers usually called "Paki-bashers" or "skinheads". 
"Paki-bashing" was partly fuelled by the media's anti-immigrant and anti-Pakistani rhetoric at the time, and by systemic failures of state authorities, which included under-reporting racist attacks, the criminal justice system not taking racist violence seriously, constant racial harassment by police, and sometimes police involvement in racist violence. Asians were frequently stereotyped as "weak" and "passive" in the 1960s and 1970s, with Pakistanis viewed as "passive objects" and "unwilling to fight back", making them seen as easy targets by "Paki-bashers". The Joint Campaign Against Racism committee reported that there had been more than 20,000 racist attacks on British people of colour, including Britons of South Asian origin, during 1985.

Drawing inspiration from the African-American civil rights movement, the Black Power movement, and the anti-apartheid movement, young British Asian activists began a number of anti-racist youth movements against "Paki-bashing", including the Bradford Youth Movement in 1977, the Bangladeshi Youth Movement following the murder of Altab Ali in 1978, and the Newham Youth Movement following the murder of Akhtar Ali Baig in 1980.

The earliest groups to resist "Paki-bashing" date back to 19681970, with two distinct movements that emerged: the integrationist approach began by the Pakistani Welfare Association and National Federation of Pakistani Associations attempted to establish positive race relations while maintaining law and order, which was contrasted by the autonomous approach began by the Pakistani Progressive Party and the Pakistani Workers' Union which engaged in vigilantism as self-defence against racially motivated violence and police harassment in conjunction with the Black Power movement (often working with the British Black Panthers and Communist Workers League of Britain) while also seeking to replace the "weak" and "passive" stereotypes of Pakistanis and Asians. Divisions arose between the integrationist and autonomous movements by 1970, with integrationist leader Raja Mahmudabad criticising the vigilantism of the latter as "alien to the spirit and practice of Islam" whereas PPP/PWU leader Abdul Hye stated they "have no intention of fighting or killing anyone, but if it comes to us, we will hit back." It was not until the 1980s and 1990s that academics began to take racially motivated violence into serious focus, partly as a result of black and Asian people entering academic life.

In the 21st century, some younger British Pakistanis and other British South Asians have attempted to reclaim the word, thus drawing parallels to the LGBT reclamation of the slur "queer" and the African American reclamation of the slur "nigger". Peterborough businessman Abdul Rahim, who produces merchandise reclaiming the word, equates it to more socially accepted terms such as "Aussie" and "Kiwi", saying that it is more similar to them than it is to "nigger", as it denotes a nationality and not a biological race. However, other British Pakistanis see use of the word as unacceptable even among members of their community, due to its historical usage in a negative way.

In December 2000, the Advertising Standards Authority published research on attitudes of the British public to pejoratives. It ranked Paki as the tenth severest pejorative in the English language, up from seventeenth three years earlier.

Several scholars have compared Islamophobic street violence in the 2000s and 2010s to that of Paki-bashing in the 1970s and 1980s. Robert Lambert notes that a key difference is that, whereas the National Front and BNP targeted all British South Asians (including Muslims, Hindus and Sikhs), the English Defence League (EDL) specifically target British Muslims. Lambert also compares the media's role in fuelling "Paki-bashing" in the late 20th century to its role in fuelling Islamophobic sentiment in the early 21st century. Geddes notes that variations of the "Paki" racial slur are occasionally used by members of the EDL.

Canada
The term is also used as a slur in Canada against Canadians of Pakistani descent. This term is also used as a slur against Canadians of other South Asian descent, along with those who are viewed as racialized Muslims. The term migrated to Canada around the 1970s with increased Pakistani immigration to Canada. In 2008, a campaign sign for an Alberta Liberal Party candidate in Edmonton was defaced when the slur was spray painted on it.

Notable uses 
Americans generally are unfamiliar with the word "Paki" as a slur because it is also just an abbreviation used by millions of people, and U.S. leaders and public figures have occasionally had to apologise for using it. In January 2002, U.S. President George W. Bush said on India–Pakistan relations that "We are working hard to convince both the Indians and the Pakis that there's a way to deal with their problems without going to war." After a Pakistani American journalist complained, a White House spokesman made a statement that Bush had great respect for Pakistan. This followed an incident four years earlier, when Clinton White House adviser Sandy Berger had to apologise for referencing "Pakis" in public comments. 

The 2015 American film Jurassic World was mocked satirically by British Asian comedian Guz Khan for using "pachys" (pronounced "pakis") as shorthand for the genera Pachycephalosaurus.

Spike Milligan, who was white, played the lead role of Kevin O'Grady in the 1969 LWT sitcom Curry and Chips. O'Grady, half-Irish and half-Pakistani, was taunted with the name "Paki-Paddy"; the show intended to mock racism and bigotry. Following complaints, the BBC edited out use of the word in repeats of the 1980s sitcom Only Fools and Horses. Columnists have perceived this as a way of obscuring the historical truth that the use of such words was commonplace at the time. The word was used in Rita, Sue and Bob Too – set in Bradford, one of the first cities to have a large Pakistani community – and also in East is East – in which it is used by the mixed-race family as well as by racist characters. In the 2018 biopic Bohemian Rhapsody, Freddie Mercury, who was Indian Parsi, is often addressed derogatorily as a "Paki" when he worked as a baggage handler at London Heathrow Airport in 1970.

In 2009, Prince Harry was publicly admonished and was made by the military to undergo sensitivity training when he was caught on video (taken years before) calling one of his fellow Army recruits "our little Paki friend."

See also 
British Asian
British Bangladeshi
British Indian
British Pakistanis
British Sri Lankan
Islam in the United Kingdom

References 

English profanity
Ethnic and religious slurs
Anti-Pakistan sentiment
English words
Anti–South Asian slurs
Stereotypes of South Asian people